Check it Out was a youth-oriented television series produced twice weekly by Tyne Tees Television for ITV from 1979 to 1982. It presented a mix of rock music performances and segments dealing with social issues including homelessness and homosexuality.

Check it Out was produced concurrently with Tyne Tees' new music series Alright Now, from 1979 to 1980.

The show was notorious for an appearance by the band Public Image Ltd, in which John Lydon became angry at the interviewer's questions and walked out of the studio.  Co-presented by Chris Cowey.

See also
Revolver (TV series)
Top of the Pops
Old Grey Whistle Test
The Tube (TV series) – produced by Tyne Tees for Channel 4

External links
BFI profile of Check it Out

1970s British music television series
1980s British music television series
1979 British television series debuts
1982 British television series endings
English-language television shows
Television series by ITV Studios
Television shows produced by Tyne Tees Television